Braided hair is hair that has been tied into braids. Braided hair may also refer to:

"Braided Hair", a kind of Coronet large cent
"Braided Hair", a song from the 2002 1 Giant Leap album 1 Giant Leap